is a Japanese yonkoma manga artist and illustrator born on 8 September 1958 in Kyoto, Japan. She graduated from Ritsumeikan University with a degree in psychology, and was a member of the manga club while there.

She has illustrated multiple cards for the Japanese edition of Magic: The Gathering.

Terashima is divorced. She has a close friendship with manga artist and illustrator Naoko Kanazawa, and her younger sister is manga artist Yoshiko Terakawa.

Works
Works are listed alphabetically. Number of volumes and publisher are in parentheses, if known.
Ai no Wakakusayama Monogatari (2 volumes, Takeshobo)
Children Play (Kodansha)
Kamaboko Nikki (Hakusensha)
Kuriko-san Konnichi wa (Takeshobo)
Kuriko no Himekuri Calendar (Takeshobo)
Kyō no Nanyōbi (ASCII)
Moko Moko no Hitotsu (Asahi Sonorama)
Power of Mama (1 volume, Studio Ship)
Sokotsu no Hibi (Kawade Shobō Shinsha)
Tadasuke Nikki (Takeshobo)
Titanic Mama (Studio Ship)
Tsuiraku Nisshi (2 volumes, ASCII)
Udonland (5 volumes + , Channel Zero)

Sources:

References

External links
 Unofficial site

1958 births
Japanese illustrators
Living people
Manga artists
Artists from Kyoto